Hedamycin is a chemical compound with potential antibiotic and anticancer activity.

References

Antibiotics